Yateras is a municipality in the Guantánamo Province of Cuba. The municipal seat is located in the town of Palenque, in the northern part of the province. Alejandro de Humboldt National Park, a UNESCO World Heritage Site is partly located in this municipality.

Geography
The municipality is divided into the barrios of Casimbas, Casisey Abajo, Casisey Arriba, Guayabal, Palmar, Río Seco, San Andrés, Sigual and Yateras. Jamaica, now seat of Manuel Tames municipality, was part of Yateras until the reform of 1976.

Demographics
In 2004, the municipality of Yateras had a population of 20,358.

International relations

Twin towns – Sister cities
Yateras is twinned with:
 Boulder, Colorado, United States, since 1987

See also
List of cities in Cuba
Municipalities of Cuba

References

External links

Populated places in Guantánamo Province